Edgar Linton is a fictional character in Emily Brontë's 1847 novel Wuthering Heights. His role in the story is that of Catherine Earnshaw's husband.  He resides at Thrushcross Grange and falls prey to Heathcliff's schemes for revenge against his family.

Edgar is the father of his and Catherine's daughter, Catherine Linton, and the brother of Isabella Linton.  He is the foil of Heathcliff as a character, as shown by his tender, kind, loving, gentle, and weak personality as opposed to Heathcliff's savage, tyrannical nature.

Description 
Edgar Linton is regarded as the complete opposite of Heathcliff. Edgar has fair hair, pale skin, and blue eyes, and leads a quiet life at Thrushcross Grange, a home of peace and goodwill until Heathcliff's return. Edgar is said to be constitutionally weak, as is the case throughout the Linton family. Edgar becomes very distressed when he realizes that he cannot match the fire and passion of his wayward wife and her soul mate, Heathcliff. Edgar loves Catherine dearly despite her passion for Heathcliff, and adores their daughter, Cathy, who is named after his wife. When Edgar's sister, Isabella, marries Heathcliff, Edgar insists that he will no longer have a relationship with her, and that they are brother and sister only in name. His features are described within Wuthering Heights' as such:

Mrs. Dean raised the candle, and I discerned a soft-featured face, exceedingly resembling the young lady at the Heights, but more pensive and amiable in expression.  It formed a sweet picture.  The long light hair curled slightly on the temples; the eyes were large and serious; the figure almost too graceful.

References

Characters in Wuthering Heights
Romance film characters
Drama film characters